Roger Pomerleau (born 7 June 1947) is a Canadian politician and carpenter. He served in the House of Commons of Canada from 1993 to 1997 and again from 2008 to 2011.

Born in Montreal, Quebec, Pomerleau was elected in the Anjou—Rivière-des-Prairies electoral district under the Bloc Québécois party in the 1993 federal election, thus serving in the 35th Canadian Parliament. He was defeated by Liberal candidate Yvon Charbonneau in the 1997 federal election. He returned to the House of Commons as a Bloc Québécois member following the 2008 federal election in which he won the Drummond electoral district. In the 2011 federal election Pomerleau was defeated by New Democratic Party candidate François Choquette.

References

External links
 
 
 Roger Pomerleau at the Bloc Québécois

1947 births
Bloc Québécois MPs
Canadian carpenters
French Quebecers
Living people
Members of the House of Commons of Canada from Quebec
Politicians from Montreal
21st-century Canadian politicians